George Palmer Putnam (September 7, 1887 – January 4, 1950) was an American publisher, writer and explorer. Known for his marriage to (and being the widower of) Amelia Earhart, he had also achieved fame as one of the most successful promoters in the United States during the 1930s.

Early life
George Palmer Putnam was born in Rye, New York on September 7, 1887, the son of John Bishop Putnam and the grandson of his namesake, George Palmer Putnam, founder of the prominent publishing firm that became G. P. Putnam's Sons. He studied at Harvard University and the University of California, Berkeley.

In 1911, Putnam married Dorothy Binney (1888–1982), the daughter of Edwin Binney, inventor and co-owner, with cousin C. Harold Smith, of Binney & Smith Inc., the company that made Crayola crayons. They had two sons, David Binney Putnam (1913–1992) and George Palmer Putnam, Jr. (1921-2013), and for a time lived in Bend, Oregon, where Putnam was the publisher and editor of the local newspaper, the Bend Bulletin. He was mayor of Bend from 1912 to 1913. Putnam left Bend in 1915 to become the private secretary to Oregon Governor James Withycombe.

Within a few years, George and Dorothy moved to the East Coast, where Putnam entered the family publishing business in New York City.

During World War I, Putnam served with the United States Army field artillery. In 1926, under the sponsorship of the American Museum of Natural History, he led an expedition to the Arctic, up the west coast of Greenland. The following year he headed another expedition for the American Geographical Society to collect wildlife specimens on Baffin Island.

1920s and 1930s business interests
In July 1927 Putnam was responsible for the blockbuster publication of "We", Charles Lindbergh's autobiographical account of his early life and his Orteig Prize winning non-stop transatlantic solo flight from New York to Paris in May of that year. The book was one of the most successful non-fiction titles of all time, selling more than 650,000 copies in less than a year and earning its author over $250,000.

In 1927, Putnam's wife, Dorothy Binney, traveled to South America and began a long, well-chronicled affair with George Weymouth, a man 19 years her junior; Putnam would leave Binney two years later. Many thought that George had left his first wife for Amelia Earhart, although for Binney, it was her own ticket out of an unhappy marriage.

In 1930, the various Putnam heirs voted to merge the family's publishing firm with Minton, Balch & Co., which became the majority stockholders. George P. Putnam resigned from his position as secretary of G. P. Putnam's Sons and joined New York publishers Brewer & Warren as vice president.

A significant event in Putnam's personal and business life occurred in 1928, before the merger. Because of his reputation for working with Lindbergh, he was contacted by Amy Phipps Guest, a wealthy American living in London, who wanted to sponsor the first-ever flight by a woman across the Atlantic Ocean.

Guest asked Putnam to find a suitable candidate, and he eventually came up with the then-unknown aviator, Amelia Earhart. As it turned out, they shared many common interests: hiking, swimming, camping, riding, tennis and golf. When Putnam first met Earhart he was still married to Binney. After she completed her flight across the Atlantic, Putnam offered to help Earhart write a book about it, following the formula he had established with Lindbergh in the writing of "WE". The resulting Earhart book was 20 Hrs., 40 Min. (1928).

When they began writing, Putnam invited Earhart to live in his home, because he felt it would make the process easier. Shortly after, Binney left for South America. George and Dorothy divorced in 1929. Putnam had undertaken to promote Earhart in a campaign that included lecture tours and mass-market endorsements for luggage, Lucky Strike cigarettes (this caused image problems for her, and McCall's magazine retracted an offer) and other products.

Putnam and Earhart made their relationship official shortly after his divorce was finalized, but they didn't marry until 1931. Earhart's ideas on marriage were liberal for the time, as she believed in equal responsibilities for both "breadwinners" and pointedly kept her own surname. GP, as she called him, soon learned that he would be called "Mr. Earhart".

There was no honeymoon for the newlyweds because Earhart was involved in a nine-day cross-country tour promoting autogyros and the tour sponsor, Beech-Nut chewing gum. Although Earhart and Putnam had no children, he had two sons by his previous marriage, the explorer and writer David Binney Putnam (1913–1992) and George Palmer Putnam, Jr. (1921–2013). Earhart was especially fond of David who frequently visited his father at their family home in Rye, New York. George had contracted polio shortly after his parents' separation and was unable to visit as often.

Following Earhart's successful 1932 solo transatlantic flight, Putnam again organized her public engagements and speaking tour across the United States. Earhart joined the faculty of Purdue University College of Technology  in 1935 as a visiting faculty member to counsel women on careers and as a technical advisor to the Department of Aeronautics.

Earhart disappeared in 1937 while on her second attempt to complete a circumnavigational flight of the globe. In addition to her first work, Putnam published two other books Earhart wrote about flying, The Fun of It (1932), a memoir of her flying experiences and an essay on women in aviation and Last Flight (1937), consisting of letters and memorandum compiled by Putnam after her disappearance. Putnam also published her biography in 1939 under the title Soaring Wings: A Biography of Amelia Earhart. Although a major blaze at the Putnam residence in Rye destroyed many family treasures and Earhart's personal mementos, Putnam later donated some of Earhart's belongings, including photographs, private letters and a flight jacket, to Purdue University, where she had worked as a career counselor. Other personal effects were sent to the Women's Archives in New York.

Putnam had Earhart declared dead on January 5, 1939, and remarried on May 21 of that year to Jean-Marie Cosigny James.

Later years
In 1938, Putnam set up a new publishing company in California, George Palmer Putnam Inc. With America's entry into World War II in 1941, Putnam resumed active service, joining an intelligence unit as a captain and rising to the rank of major by 1942. In 1945, he and "Jeannie" divorced; she had initiated the action, citing incompatibility. Shortly after, he remarried again, to Margaret Havilland. They operated the Stove Pipe Wells resort in Death Valley, California.

In the book Death Valley Handbook (1947), Putnam was the binomial author of the plant taxon Gilia mohavensis (H.Mason) Putnam. The name has since slipped into synonymy with Linanthus mohavensis H.Mason, its basionym (or original species name).

George Putnam authored a number of books, including:
 Death Valley and Its Country (1946)
 Death Valley Handbook (1947)
 Hickory Shirt (1948)
 Hot Oil (1935)
 In the Oregon Country: Out-doors in Oregon, Washington, and California, Together with some Legendary Lore, and Glimpses of the Modern West in the Making (1915)
 Smiting the Rock: A tale of Oregon (1918) 
 Soaring Wings: A Biography of Amelia Earhart (1939)
 Wide Margins (1942 autobiography)
 Up In Our Country (1950)

Death
In late 1949, Putnam fell ill at his home in the Stove Pipe Wells, California resort in Death Valley, suffering from kidney failure. He died in Trona, California on January 4, 1950, aged 62. His body was cremated and the ashes interred in the Chapel of the Pines Crematory in Los Angeles.

Honors
Amelia Earhart, Putnam's second wife, was the first president of The Ninety-Nines, an organization of (originally) 99 female pilots formed in 1929 for the support and advancement of aviation. Putnam had proposed an award as a means of honoring anyone who supports an individual member of the group (known as a "49½"), a Chapter or Section, or the organization as a whole. The "George Palmer Putnam 49½ Award" was originated to recognize such exceptional support of The Ninety-Nines.

In 1927, the Boy Scouts of America made Putnam an "Honorary Scout", a new category of Scout created that same year. This distinction was given to "American citizens whose achievements in outdoor activity, exploration and worthwhile adventure are of such an exceptional character as to capture the imagination of boys...". 

Due to his relationship with Amelia Earhart, Putnam has been the subject of numerous feature and documentary films including: Amelia Earhart (1976) with John Forsythe portraying Putnam. In Amelia Earhart: The Final Flight (1994), Bruce Dern played him. The documentary Amelia Earhart: The Price of Courage (1993) from American Experience also featured the Putnam-Earhart marriage. Richard Gere portrayed Putnam in the 2009 movie, Amelia.

Popular culture

In Flying Blind, a "Nathan Heller" novel by Max Allan Collins, George Putnam is a major character, but is portrayed as a villain using Earhart for his own purposes.

References
Notes

Citations

Bibliography

 Butler, Susan. East to the Dawn: The Life of Amelia Earhart. Reading, Massachusetts: Addison-Wesley, 1997. .
 Chapman, Sally Putnam, with Stephanie Mansfield. Whistled Like a Bird: The Untold Story of Dorothy Putnam, George Putnam, and Amelia Earhart. New York: Warner Books, 1997. .
 Goldstein, Donald M. and Katherine V. Dillon. Amelia: The Centennial Biography of an Aviation Pioneer. Washington, D.C.: Brassey's, 1997. .
 Greenspan, Ezra. George Palmer Putnam: Representative American Publisher. University Park, Pennsylvania: Pennsylvania State University Press, 2000. .
 Lovell, Mary S. The Sound of Wings. New York: St. Martin's Press, 1989. .
 Pearce, Carol Ann. Amelia Earhart. New York: Facts on File, 1988. .
 Wohl, Robert. The Spectacle of Flight: Aviation and the Western Imagination, 1920–1950. New Haven, Connecticut: Yale University Press, 2005. .

External links

 
 
 George Palmer Putnam
 
 
 Amelia Earhart (subscription required)
 Earhart's Life and Marriage

American book publishers (people)
20th-century American biographers
American explorers
American travel writers
1887 births
1950 deaths
Amelia Earhart
Editors of Oregon newspapers
United States Army personnel of World War I
United States Army personnel of World War II
Death Valley
Mayors of places in Oregon
Harvard University alumni
University of California, Berkeley alumni
People from Bend, Oregon
People from Inyo County, California
People from Rye, New York
Deaths from kidney failure
Burials at Chapel of the Pines Crematory
Writers from California
Writers from New York (state)
Writers from Salem, Oregon
20th-century American businesspeople
20th-century American non-fiction writers
20th-century publishers (people)
United States Army officers